Pier Miqueas Barrios (born 1 July 1990) is an Argentine footballer, who plays for Godoy Cruz. He has played on loan spells for RSC Anderlecht, Gimnasia y Esgrima de Jujuy and Ferro Carril Oeste.

Career
Barrios was born in Córdoba, Argentina. He began his career with Belgrano de Córdoba and made his debut in the 2008 season in the Promocion. The 19-year-old defender left on 10 June 2010 his club Club Atlético Belgrano to join on a one-year deal to RSC Anderlecht.

Notes

External links

1990 births
Living people
Footballers from Córdoba, Argentina
Argentine footballers
Argentine expatriate footballers
Association football defenders
Club Atlético Belgrano footballers
R.S.C. Anderlecht players
Gimnasia y Esgrima de Jujuy footballers
Ferro Carril Oeste footballers
Atlético Tucumán footballers
San Martín de Tucumán footballers
Quilmes Atlético Club footballers
Godoy Cruz Antonio Tomba footballers
Argentine Primera División players
Primera Nacional players
Argentine expatriate sportspeople in Belgium
Expatriate footballers in Belgium